John Lewin is the author of a number of Manx carvals in the early 19th Century which advocated temperance.

He was a sumner (church warden of official) in Jurby, Isle of Man, during the 1830s, but other than this there is little biographical information available. There are four extant poems that are attributed to him, all of which were collected as folk songs at the end of the 19th century.

Lewin’s ‘My Chaarjyn, Gow Shiu Tastey’ (‘My Friends, Take You Notice’) was composed sometime around 1836 and concerns the dangers of excessive alcohol. (It has also been known by another title, ‘Carval er Feeyn as Jough’ (‘Carol on Wine and Strong Drink’)). Although subsequently taken up by the Manx abstinence movement, the carval (a form of carol in Manx) clearly states that it is not alcohol which is a sin, but its abuse by those who drink to excess.

A melody for this carval, entitled ‘Lewin’s ‘Total’ Hymn’,  was collected by the Manx folk music collector, W. H. Gill, on Saturday August 3, 1895, from a John Kissack at Ballacurrey Cottage, Jurby.

In c. 1845, Lewin composed ‘Pingyn Yn Ommidan’ (‘The Fool’s Pence’) with Evan Christian of Lewaigue, Maughold. This was a 24 verse carval on the same temperance theme, although this time concerning the story of an individual man whose life was wrecked through alcoholism. A prose version of the story also exists.

Lewin is attributed with having written two other carvals, ‘Yn Ven-Ainshtyr Dewil’ (‘The Cruel Mistress’) and ‘Yn Chenn Dolphin’ (‘The Old Dolphin’). The former tells the tale of a man whose female employer falls in love with him, but in retribution for his rejection of her, she plants a ring in his pocket and denounces him as a thief. The latter concerns a group of Manx fishermen surviving a storm and reporting back to the owners of their boat.

References

Manx poets
Manx language activists
19th-century poets
Year of birth missing
Year of death missing